The 2003 NCAA Division I Women's Lacrosse Championship was the 22nd annual single-elimination tournament to determine the national champion of Division I NCAA women's college lacrosse. The championship game was played at the Carrier Dome in Syracuse, New York during May 2003. All NCAA Division I women's lacrosse programs were eligible for this championship. A total of 16 teams were invited to participate.

Princeton defeated Virginia, 8–7 (in overtime), to win their third overall, and second consecutive, national championship.

The leading scorer for the tournament was Lauren Aumiller from Virginia (21 goals). Rachel Becker, from Princeton, was named the tournament's Most Outstanding Player.

Qualification

Tournament bracket

All-tournament team 
Suzanne Eyler, Loyola (MD)
Marianne Gioffre, Loyola (MD)
Kelly Coppedge, Maryland
Alexis Venechanos, Maryland
Rachel Becker, Princeton (Most outstanding player)
Sarah Kolodner, Princeton
Whitney Miller, Princeton
Elizabeth Pillion, Princeton
Theresa Sherry, Princeton
Caitlin Banks, Virginia
Lauri Kenis, Virginia

See also
2003 NCAA Division I Men's Lacrosse Championship
2003 NCAA Division II Women's Lacrosse Championship
2003 NCAA Division III Women's Lacrosse Championship

References

NCAA Division I Women's Lacrosse Championship
NCAA Division I Women's Lacrosse Championship
NCAA Women's Lacrosse Championship